State Highway 79 (SH 79) is a  long state highway in Adams and Weld counties in Colorado. The highway is also called "Kiowa–Bennett Road" and "Converse Road". It traverses through remote, open plain. The highway does not pass through any towns. It does service some subdivisions in the area. SH 79's southern terminus is at Interstate 70 (I-70), U.S. Route 36 (US 36), US 40 and US 287 south of Bennett, and the northern terminus is at SH 52 in Prospect Valley.

Route description
The road begins at I-70, concurrent there with US 287, US 36 and US 40. It then heads northward into the town of Bennett, where it abruptly turns eastward and begins a short concurrency with SH 36. It then heads back northward slowly into a mass of rectangular fields, crossing the Adams–Weld county line. It continues northward in the same terrain, crossing numerous county roads, to its north end at SH 52.

History
The road was established in the 1920s, when it connected Bennett to Prospect. SH 79 was extended to Elbert County in 1954. The following year, the extension was deleted. The road was entirely paved and extended again down to its current terminus at Interstate 70 in 1963.

Major intersections

References

External links

079
Transportation in Adams County, Colorado
Transportation in Weld County, Colorado